is a Japanese fantasy-action-comedy film directed by Katsuhide Motoki.

Story
A group of Kyoto University students known as the “Kyoto University Azure Dragons”, participate in a game called "Horumo". It is an ancient game in which players control shikigami called “oni” and pit them against the oni of rival teams, reminiscent of Pokémon. Akira Abe is a freshman student who falls in love with a classmate named Kyoko, and blindly joins the club and plays the game to be closer to her. Ironically, Kyoko is interested in another club member, while Akira gains the attention of Fumi. The mysterious game started over 1,200 years ago in the Heian Period. Soon the 2,000 oni wage wars battles in the city of Kyoto.

Cast
Takayuki Yamada ...  Akira Abe
Chiaki Kuriyama ...  Fumi Kusunoki
Gaku Hamada ...  Koichi Takamura
Sei Ashina ...  Kyoko Sawara
Takuya Ishida ...  Mitsuru Ashiya
Yoshiyoshi Arakawa ...  Makoto Sugawara
Tamiyasu Cho ...  Akahito Kakimoto
Renji Ishibashi ... Berobero Bartender
Papaya Suzuki ... Gensai Suzuki
Takayo Mimura ... Tomiko Ryuzoji
Megumi Sato ... Mika Tachibana
Masato Wada ... Hitoshi Kiyomori
Keita Saito ... Miyoshi Younger Brother
Shota Saito ... Miyoshi Older Brother

References

External links
 Official website
 Japan Reviewed - Battle League Horumo

2009 films
2000s Japanese-language films
Films directed by Katsuhide Motoki
2009 science fiction films
Japanese fantasy comedy films
New People films
2000s Japanese films